The World After Dinosaurs is a documentary produced by NHK, which focuses on the evolution of mammals throughout the Mesozoic into the Cenozoic. In America, the documentary aired on the National Geographic Channel under the name Life After Dinosaurs.

Animals that appear 
 Adelobasileus
 Placerias
 Desmatosuchus
 Coelophysis
 Stegosaurus
 Allosaurus
 Supersaurus
 Laolestes
 Eomaia
 Sinosauropteryx
 Cimolestes
 Citipati
 Triceratops
 Tyrannosaurus
 Kritosaurus
 Deinosuchus
 Carnotaurus
 Generic Ankylosaur (based on the ichnotaxon Ligabueichnium, but named Edmontonia in the show)
 Saltasaurus
 Leptictidium
 Propalaeotherium
 Europolemur
 Gastornis
 Diplocynodon
 Bemalambda
 Archaeolambda
 Entelodon
 Embolotherium
 Hyaenodon
 Paraceratherium
 Thylacosmilus
 Doedicurus
 Promacrauchenia
 Alcidedorbignya
 Mayulestes
 Asiocoryphodon
 Smilodon
 Tingamarra

2010 Japanese television series debuts
Television series about dinosaurs